The National Executive Council (NEC), also known as the Cabinet of Papua New Guinea functions as the policy and decision-making body of the executive branch within the government system of Papua New Guinea. The Prime Minister and Ministers serve as members of the Cabinet.

NEC building 
Sir Manasupe Haus (House) is the building that hosts the Department of the Prime Minister and the National Executive Council. Formerly known as Marea House, fondly referred to as the "Pineapple Building" due to its shape, it is named after Sir Manasupe Zurenuoc, a former Chief Secretary of PNG. It was renamed and reopened on 27 January 2016 after being closed for renovations funded by Oil Search.

Functions 
All executive power in the government is vested in the National Executive Council, which comprises all Ministers of the Crown. Unlike Australia, whose has a two-tier level of government between the Cabinet for political decision and the Federal Executive Council for purely formal decisions, the NEC is patterned along the precedent of the former as it makes policy decisions. The total number of Ministers comprising the National Executive Council is never to be less than a quarter of the National Parliament.

There is a Secretary to the National Executive Council, who is responsible to the Prime Minister and is charge of the council Secretariat. In addition, a Senior Minister position exists on an ad hoc basis.

Current Cabinet 

Prime Minister James Marape added nine new ministers to his cabinet on 20 December 2020.

Past Cabinets

Second Marape Cabinet 
James Marape announced his second Cabinet on 1 October 2020.

First Marape Cabinet 
Prime Minister James Marape appointed his first Cabinet on 7 June 2019.

Marape Caretaker Cabinet 
James Marape was elected as Prime Minister on 30 May 2019, and on 31 May he appointed a caretaker Cabinet.

O'Neill-Abel Cabinet

Following the re-election of Peter O'Neill's government at the 2017 election, O'Neill appointed his Cabinet on 9 August 2017.

First O'Neill Cabinet 
With Prime Minister Sir Michael Somare having been hospitalised for a serious heart condition, leadership of the nation was vested in Deputy Prime Minister Sam Abal in April 2011. In August, following a Cabinet reshuffle which had led three ministers to join the Opposition, the latter brought a successful motion of no confidence in Abal's government. Parliament chose Peter O'Neill to serve as Prime Minister.

On 27 February 2012, O'Neill removed the Finance portfolio from Don Polye, taking it on himself. He cited "the continuing lack of ability by the department and ministry of finance to contain expenditure overruns outside of the budget appropriations". Polye retained the Treasury portfolio, and gained that of Border Development. O'Neill hinted that the Finance ministry would eventually be returned to him, and also hinted at an imminent major Cabinet reshuffle.

On 9 August 2012, following a general election, O'Neill announced the following cabinet for the 2012–2017 term:

In February 2014, the following reshuffle took place. Police Minister Nixon Duban (MP for Madang, National Congress Party) was reshuffled to the position of Minister of Petroleum and Energy, replacing William Duma (MP for Mount Hagen, United Resources Party), who was dropped from the Cabinet; O'Neill suggested that Duma had not adhered to the principle of Cabinet solidarity. Robert Atiyafa (MP for Henganofi) was appointed as Minister for Police. David Arore (MP for the Northern Province, T.H.E. Party) was replaced as Minister for Higher Education by Delilah Gore (MP for Sohe, T.H.E. Party), while Nick Kuman (MP for Gumine) was appointed Minister for Education. It was the first time ever that the country's Cabinet included two women: Delilah Gore, and Community Development Minister Loujaya Kouza (MP for Lae).

On 10 March 2014, O'Neill sacked his Minister for Finance Don Polye (leader of the T.H.E. Party, the second-largest party in the government), and Minister for Industrial Relations Mark Maipakai, having accused them of destabilising the government.

In August 2014, Community Development Minister Loujaya Kouza resigned to serve as interim chair Lae City Commission. In a reshuffle, she was replaced by Delilah Gore, who in turn was replaced as Minister for Higher Education by Malakai Tabar. William Duma, ousted from the government in February, was re-admitted, this time as Minister for Transport.

In August 2015 Minister for Religion, Youth and Community Development Delilah Gore was suspended for three months without pay after verbally assaulting and threatening a flight attendant who had asked her to turn off her mobile phone on an Air Niugini flight. (Gore was removed from the plane as a consequence of her behaviour.)

In July 2016, Minister for Petroleum and Energy Ben Micah resigned from the government and joined the Opposition. He was replaced by Nixon Duban, who was in turn replaced as Minister for Transport by Malakai Tabar. Tabar was replaced as Minister for Higher Education by Francis Marus (MP for Talasea), who was promoted from the back benches.

Somare Cabinet 2007-2011
In the 2007 general election, the National Alliance-led government headed by Sir Michael Somare was returned.  The first Cabinet of the new government was announced on 29 August 2007.

The Cabinet contained 28 ministers. They were assisted by 12 parliamentary secretaries, who were not officially part of the Cabinet.

Media comment on the new cabinet focused on the demotion of the previous Deputy Prime Minister Don Polye, the relatively low number of Highlands MPs in Cabinet, and the potential for conflict of interest in the appointment of Belden Namah, a forest landowner and principal of a company involved in logging in West Sepik Province, as Forestry Minister.

The Opposition's shadow ministry was announced on 31 August 2007.

On 14 August 2009, Don Polye was removed from his position as Member of Parliament, and Minister for Works, Transport & Civil Aviation, when the National Court determined that his victory in the 2007 general election was invalid. The Prime Minister assumed responsibility for Polye's Transport and Works ministries as an interim measure until Polye's by-election is held on 9 November 2009, while Culture and Tourism Minister Charles Abel acquired the Civil Aviation ministerial portfolio.

In May 2010, Attorney-General and Justice Minister Allan Marat, leader of the Melanesian Liberal Party, publicly criticised aspects of government policy, and resigned upon being asked to do so by Prime Minister Michael Somare. Ano Pala, National Alliance Party MP for Rigo, was appointed in his place.

This was the Cabinet as of February 2011. (The list of parliamentary secretaries is also accurate as of February 2011. The list of Shadow Ministers, however, is from September 2007.)

See also 

 Executive council (Commonwealth countries)

References

Politics of Papua New Guinea
Political organisations based in Papua New Guinea
Government of Papua New Guinea
Main
Papua New Guinea